Agra Province was a part of the United Provinces of Agra and Oudh of British India during the closing decades of the British Raj, from 1904 until 1947; it corresponded (under Section 4(4) of United Provinces Act 1, 1904) to the former regions, Ceded and Conquered Provinces (1805–1836) and the North Western Provinces (1836–1902).

Further reading
Dharma Bhanu, The Province of Agra: its history and administration (Concept Publishing Company, 1979)

See also 
 Agra Presidency
 Agra Subah, Mughal precursor
 Company rule in India
 United Provinces of Agra and Oudh
 Presidencies and provinces of British India
 British Raj

Notes

Provinces of British India
British administration in Uttar Pradesh